Kyaukme dam ( Upper Yeywa Hydropower Project) is a dam in Burma.

References

Dams in Myanmar